Nicole Markotić is a Canadian poet and novelist who lives in Windsor, Ontario. She teaches creative writing at the University of Windsor. Markotic specializes in the subjects of Canadian literature, poetry, children's literature, disability in film and disability in literature. Previously she was an assistant professor at the University of Calgary. She was the co-editor, along with Ashok Mathur, of Calgary-based DisOrientation Chapbooks. She was the poetry editor of Red Deer College Press from 1998 to 2004.

She co-edited The Problem Body: Projecting Disability on Film a critical book about disability in film, which was published by Ohio State Press in 2010. She also edited Robert Kroetsch: Essays on His Works, which was released in 2017.

Bibliography
connect the dots – 1994
Yellow Pages: a catalogue of intentions – 1995
more excess – 1997
minotaurs & other alphabets – 1998
Widows and Orphans  – 2004
Scrapbook of My Years as a Zealot  – 2008
Bent at the Spine – 2012
"Rough Patch" – 2017
After Beowulf - 2022

Awards
 bpNichol Chapbook Award (minotaurs & other alphabets, 1998)

References

Canadian women poets
Writers from Windsor, Ontario
Living people
20th-century Canadian poets
21st-century Canadian poets
Academic staff of University of Windsor
20th-century Canadian women writers
21st-century Canadian women writers
1962 births
Disability studies academics